Brogo Dam is a minor ungated rockfill embankment dam with an uncontrolled unlined rock cut spillway across the Brogo River upstream of Brogo in the South Coast region of New South Wales, Australia. The dam's purpose includes environmental flows, hydro-electric power generation, irrigation, and water supply. The impounded reservoir is also called Brogo Dam.

Location and features
The dam was built by Citra Constructions Pty Limited on behalf of the New South Wales Department of Land and Water Conservation to supply water for irrigation and potable water for the towns of Quaama, Cobargo, and Bermagui. The dam supplies water to farmers along the Brogo and Bega rivers for stock and domestic use and irrigation on improved pastures for stock feed. Dairy farming is the main industry in the Bega Valley and the dam ensures a continuous and reliable supply for this activity.

The uncontrolled unlined rock cut spillway is capable of discharging .

Power generation

Recreation
Brogo Dam is stocked with Australian Bass and eels can also be found in the dam's waters. Boating and canoeing on the dam's surface are permitted. The area surrounding the dam has abundant ferns and rock orchids that provide a photographer's paradise.

See also

 Delta Electricity
 Irrigation in Australia
 List of dams and reservoirs in Australia

References

South Coast (New South Wales)
Dams completed in 1976
Rock-filled dams
Hydroelectric power stations in New South Wales
Dams in New South Wales